John Evans, D.D. (c. 1695 - 23 March 1749) was Archdeacon of Llandaff from 1722 to 1749 and a Canon Residentiary of Llandaff Cathedral from 1721.

Evans was born at Upton Bishop and educated at Trinity College, Oxford. He held livings at Lugwardine, Bromyard and Upton Bishop. He died on 23 March 1749.

References

Archdeacons of Llandaff
People from Herefordshire
Alumni of Trinity College, Oxford
Fellows of Oriel College, Oxford
1690s births
1749 deaths
Year of birth uncertain